Gemma Jeanette Gibbons (born 6 January 1987) is a British judoka. Competing in the women's −70 kg category, she has represented England and Great Britain at Junior, U-23, 'B' and Senior level.

Early and personal life
Born in Charlton, London, Gibbons began practising Judo at six years of age with the Metro Judo Club in Blackheath, London. She attended Westwood College (now Harris Academy Falconwood). Gibbons represented Greenwich in judo at the London Youth Games. She is also the 2013 patron for London Youth Games and was inducted into the London Youth Games Hall of Fame in 2012.

Gemma studied at the London Leisure College, the sports, leisure and travel department of Greenwich Community College, between 2004 and 2006 on 'BTEC National Award' and 'BTEC National Certificate in Sports and Exercise Science' courses. Starting her degree in Sports Performance at the University of Bath, Gibbons continued to practice Judo, winning a Full Blues award in 2007 from the University.

In June 2013 she married Scottish judoka Euan Burton at The Caves in Edinburgh. The couple also now reside in the city. She subsequently put her studies for a physical education teaching degree on hold, to concentrate on working towards competing at the 2016 Summer Olympics in Rio de Janeiro.

Natalie Powell was selected ahead of Gibbons to represent GB at the 2016 Summer Olympics.

Career
Gibbons started training with the Metro Judo Club, and after training with UELSports at the University of East London, is now a member of the British Judo Performance Institute.

Gibbons won the BBC Radio London Young Sports Woman of the Year Award 2006. Shortly after graduating, she won bronze in the under-70 kg class at the 2009 World University Games.

Kate Howey, Performance Development Squad Coach for 2012 stated that Gibbons "is one of our best medal hopes for judo" in the 2012 London Olympic and Paralympic Games. In 2012 and ranked 42nd in the world at the time, at the 2012 London Olympics Gibbons won the silver medal, losing to Kayla Harrison in the -78 kg event. Television coverage of the Olympics showed footage of a teary-eyed Gibbons looking upwards and mouthing "I love you mum" after winning her semifinal match, thus guaranteeing a medal. Gibbons had lost her mother to leukaemia years earlier. The moment became an iconic image of the Games, featuring by the media in several compilations and montages connected with the event.

Achievements

See also
Judo in the United Kingdom

References

External links
 
 
 
 
 2012 Olympic −78 kg gold medal match: Kayla Harrison (United States) vs. Gemma Gibbons (United Kingdom) (International Olympic Committee on YouTube)

1987 births
Living people
People from Charlton, London
English female judoka
Sportspeople from London
Alumni of the University of East London
Alumni of the University of Bath
Alumni of the University of Edinburgh
Olympic judoka of Great Britain
Judoka at the 2012 Summer Olympics
Medalists at the 2012 Summer Olympics
Olympic silver medallists for Great Britain
Olympic medalists in judo
Commonwealth Games silver medallists for England
Commonwealth Games medallists in judo
Universiade medalists in judo
Judoka at the 2014 Commonwealth Games
Universiade bronze medalists for Great Britain
European Games competitors for Great Britain
Judoka at the 2015 European Games
Medalists at the 2009 Summer Universiade
Medallists at the 2014 Commonwealth Games